CHMC may refer to:

Chaplain of the United States Marine Corps
CIUP-FM, a Canadian radio station originally established as CHMC-FM